Lip service may refer to:

Idiom
 Lip service, an idiom for insincere talk

Film
 Lip Service (1988 film), an American comedy TV film

Television 
 Lip Service (TV series), a 2010 dramatic series broadcast on BBC Three
 Lip Service (game show), a 1990s game show aired on MTV
 Lip Service, a 2000 television film starring Gail O'Grady and Kari Wuhrer
 Lipservice, a 1998 comedy short with Seán McGinley

Music 
 Lip Service (group),  a South Korean duo
 "Lip Service" (Wet Wet Wet song), a 1992 song by Wet Wet Wet
 "Lip Service", a 1978 song by Elvis Costello from This Year's Model
 "Lip Service", a 1993 song by Debbie Harry from the album Debravation
 “Lip Service”, a 2019 song by Thaiboy Digital and ECCO2K from the album Legendary Member
 Lipservice, a 2005 album by Gotthard

Other
Lip Service, a clothing company founded by Drew Bernstein